Dan Le Batard  is an American newspaper sportswriter, ex radio host, podcast host and television reporter based in Miami, Florida. He has also worked at ESPN, and for his hometown paper, the Miami Herald, for which he wrote from 1990 to 2016.

Le Batard hosted a daily radio show with Jon Weiner that originated on WAXY in Miami and was carried nationally on ESPN Radio until early 2021. At ESPN, he also hosted Highly Questionable, which aired daily and was originally titled Dan Le Batard is Highly Questionable; Le Batard co-hosted the program with his father Gonzalo and revolving co-hosts. Additionally, he was a frequent contributor to several ESPN programs, serving as a regular replacement host for Pardon the Interruption.

Personal life 
Le Batard was born to Cuban exile parents, Gonzalo and Lourdes, who moved the family to Central Islip, New York, before settling in Miramar, Florida. Dan's brother is Miami-based artist David Le Batard, professionally known as LEBO. Le Batard is also fluent in Spanish, which he learned at home from his parents. During the 2016 exhibition Major League Baseball game in Cuba, Le Batard talked on his radio show about how his family had risked everything to come to the U.S. On September 13, 2018, Miami Herald reporter and Le Batard's longtime friend Greg "Scoops" Cote published an article announcing that Dan had become engaged to his girlfriend of two years, Valerie Scheide. The article was published without the couple's consent, which caused great embarrassment for Le Batard as he was on the air at the time the news broke.  Le Batard and Scheide were wed in November 2019 at a ceremony in Miami.

Career

Miami Herald 
Le Batard began work at the Miami Herald in 1990 and is a columnist for its sports section. His work for The Herald includes investigations of the football team of his alma mater, the University of Miami.

ESPN 
Le Batard was a frequent contributor to many programs on the ESPN television network. Among others, he was a recurring guest on Outside the Lines, The Sports Reporters, and College GameDay. He also was a regular guest host of Pardon the Interruption, where he was  christened "The Hateable Dan Le Batard" due to his sometimes controversial (and usually contrarian) opinions, as well as his unorthodox attire. Hosting duties on PTI have allowed Le Batard the implementation of the catch-phrase "Bam!", which he exclaims in various ways at the beginning of each show he guest hosts. Le Batard has a joking rivalry with former PTI stat boy Tony Reali.

In December 2020, Le Batard announced that he would be leaving ESPN, effective January 4, 2021.

Radio show 

Le Batard hosted a morning radio show weekdays with Jon "Stugotz" Weiner on ESPN Radio. Le Batard is known for his self-deprecating humor, which carries over onto the show through running jokes. Le Batard grants very few interviews about his own life, but in a rare one he did with Aventura Business Monthly in Miami in March 2011, he revealed that Tony Kornheiser, who began a long-running radio career of his own in 1992 on Washington D.C.-based WTEM, strongly encouraged him to embark on a career in the same medium, telling him: "It will link [you] to [your] community in a different way [from that of newspapers]. That it will be more intimate, more fun. It's not as lonely as writing. Writing is just you and a computer, and that it's not communal in any way. Radio is much more intimate."

Le Batard prides himself on being the "uncomfortable" sports journalist. He often writes about controversial topics, especially race.  Guests on his radio program may be asked questions ranging from the racial undertones of the Michael Vick case to the effect that race has on how players are drafted into the NBA.  After writing a column for The Herald on the former topic, Le Batard was featured on Fox News' Hannity & Colmes to discuss the issue and immediately called out the hosts for only inviting non-black people to speak on the subject.

On September 3, 2015, it was announced that the Dan Le Batard Show with Stugotz would move to the 10:00 a.m. to 1:00 p.m. time slot left vacant by the departure of Colin Cowherd from ESPN to Fox Sports where it would remain until Le Batard's own departure from ESPN.

Highly Questionable

In September 2011, ESPN launched Dan Le Batard Is ¿Highly Questionable? (retitled Highly Questionable in 2013) on ESPN as part of the afternoon "Sports Talk Block." The show originally featured Le Batard and his father, Gonzalo, whom he calls "Papi." Bomani Jones later joined the show as a host in February 2013, accompanying Dan and "Papi" in discussing current sports news and event topics, and later leaving the show in June 2017. Le Batard made his final regular appearance on Highly Questionable on January 4, 2021.

Le Batard and Friends
In early 2019, ESPN launched a podcast network called The Le Batard and Friends Podcast Network. The network includes original podcasts hosted by Le Batard (one of which is South Beach Sessions, a long-form interview program) and folks from his radio show companions, including Stugotz and the so-called Shipping Container Filled with Frightened Refugees. Other ESPN personalities that are now part of the LAF podcast network include Mina Kimes (The Mina Kimes Show featuring Lenny), Sarah Spain (That's What She Said with Sarah Spain), and Marty Smith (Marty Smith's America The Podcast).

Meadowlark Media 
Following his departure from ESPN on January 4, 2021, Le Batard and friends independently founded their own podcast network funded by Le Batard. The team recruited former head of ESPN, John Skipper, to become the new network's CEO. In November 2021, the company signed a first-look deal with Apple TV+ to produce documentaries and unscripted series. In January 2022, Skydance Sports sets up a partnership with Meadowlark Media for the production of unscripted sports content. One of their projects is a soccer documentary series called Good Rivals, a three-part series on Amazon Prime Video, which was released in November 2022.

Controversies

Baseball Hall of Fame vote 

In January 2014, it was revealed that Le Batard was the member of the BBWAA who gave his baseball Hall of Fame vote away to sports news site Deadspin allowing them to use it as a public opinion poll. On January 9, 2014, the BBWAA imposed a one-year ban on Le Batard after learning that he did it because of his criticism over the BBWAA's voting process of selecting baseball players, especially concerning players involved in performance-enhancing drug scandals. Le Batard has spoken out against the "moralizing" of the voting. Le Batard was also forever stripped of his Hall of Fame voting privileges. His ESPN colleagues were mixed in their reactions, which ranged from support to condemnation, with some wondering why Le Batard did not use ESPN.com to conduct the vote. LeBatard regretted not delaying the revelation of his involvement with the vote, as it deflected attention away from the announced inductees. He also said he "had a blind spot" about the level his colleagues were hurt by Deadspin's involvement.

LeBron James billboards 
On August 7, 2014, Le Batard was suspended for two days from his duties at ESPN for allegedly taking out a billboard in Akron, Ohio, which read "You're Welcome, Lebron. Love, Miami" and pictured two NBA championship rings. The billboard referred to LeBron James's departure from the Miami Heat and return to the Cleveland Cavaliers. On August 11, 2014, Dan Le Batard addressed his two days off-air was not because of the billboards, but because he was going to fly a plane banner with the (You're Welcome) banner at the homecoming of LeBron Friday (August 9) and do a live radio transmission to "mock the homecoming."

Zoo Miami Baby Hippo  
In October 2018 Zoo Miami’s Ron Magill, aka "The Velvet Buzzsaw", suggested naming a baby hippo as part of a fundraiser. If the $10,000 goal could be met, the hippo would be named after Dan Le Batard. In December 2018 it was announced that the baby hippo could not be named in honor of Dan Le Batard. Michael Ryan Ruiz stated that Disney policy would not allow animals to be named after personalities.

But on January 5, 2021 — the day after Dan Le Batard's contract ended with ESPN  — Zoo Miami officially announced the pygmy hippopotamus had been named Dan Le Batard.

Donald Trump's "Go Back" Tweets 
On July 18, 2019, on his radio show Le Batard criticized former President Trump’s “go back” to the “crime-infested places from which they came” tweets about four minority congresswomen and called ESPN's policy of avoiding politics on its broadcasts "cowardly". Le Batard then missed several days and several segments from his radio show over the course of the next week before eventually meeting with ESPN President Jimmy Pitaro the following week.

References

External links
 Archive of Le Batard's column at The Miami Herald 
 Show site from The Ticket Miami 
 

Living people
20th-century American male writers
20th-century American journalists
American male journalists
21st-century American male writers
21st-century American journalists
American sports announcers
American sports journalists
American sports radio personalities
American television personalities
Disney people
ESPN people
University of Miami alumni
People from Central Islip, New York
Writers from Miami
Sportswriters from Florida
Sportswriters from New York (state)
American people of Cuban descent
Year of birth missing (living people)